Dr. H. G. Osgood House, also known as the Mina Jane Ahlemeyer Property, is a historic home located at Gosport, Owen County, Indiana.  The main section of the house was built between about 1860 and 1880, and is a two-story, "T"-plan, Italianate style frame residence.  It has the original two-story rear wing, built about 1850, and one-story wing.  Also on the property are the contributing English barn / carriage barn and privy.

It was listed on the National Register of Historic Places in 1999.  It is located in the Gosport Historic District.

References

Houses on the National Register of Historic Places in Indiana
Italianate architecture in Indiana
Houses completed in 1880
Buildings and structures in Owen County, Indiana
National Register of Historic Places in Owen County, Indiana
Historic district contributing properties in Indiana